The 1896 Maryland Aggies football team represented the Maryland Agricultural College (now the University of Maryland) in the 1896 college football season. The team was led by first-year head coach Grenville Lewis and finished with a 6–2–2 record.

Schedule

Personnel
The letterwinners of the 1897 team were:
Charlie Gibbons, end
John Lillibridge, end
F. H. Peters, end
Albert Talty, end
Fred Bell, tackle
Bill Gardner, tackle
Reeder Gough, tackle
Harry Heward, tackle
Bert Nelligan, tackle
Charles Calvert, guard
Wade Hinebaugh, guard
Herbert Owen, guard
Charles Queen, guard
Charles Ridgely, guard
Butch Carver, center
Franklin Sherman, center
Pete Duffy, quarterback
Frank Kenly, quarterback
Hanson Mitchell, quarterback
Charles Cabrera, halfback
Bill Gorsuch, halfback
Bert Nelligan, halfback
Ben Watkins, halfback
Grenville Lewis, fullback, captain-coach

Manager:
Albert Gill

References

Maryland
Maryland Terrapins football seasons
Maryland Aggies football